n-Butyl acetate is an organic compound with the formula . A colorless, flammable liquid, it is the ester derived from n-butanol and acetic acid.  It is found in many types of fruit, where it imparts characteristic flavors and has a sweet smell of banana or apple.  It is used as an industrial solvent

The other three isomers (four, including stereoisomers) of butyl acetate are isobutyl acetate, tert-butyl acetate, and sec-butyl acetate (two enantiomers).

Production and use
Butyl acetate is commonly manufactured by the Fischer esterification of butanol (or its isomer to make an isomer of butyl acetate) and acetic acid with the presence of sulfuric acid:

Butyl acetate is mainly used as a solvent for coatings and inks.  It is a component of fingernail polish.

Occurrence in nature
Apples, especially of the 'Red Delicious' variety, are flavored in part by this chemical.  The alarm pheromones emitted by the Koschevnikov gland of honey bees contain butyl acetate.

References

External links

 Ethylene and other chemicals in fruit
 Material Safety Data Sheet
 CDC - NIOSH Pocket Guide to Chemical Hazards

Ester solvents
Flavors
Acetate esters
Commodity chemicals
Sweet-smelling chemicals
Butyl compounds